James Arthur Patrick Small (born March 8, 1937) is an American former professional baseball player who appeared in 108 games as an outfielder, pinch hitter and pinch runner in Major League Baseball from  to  for the Detroit Tigers and Kansas City Athletics.

Small was signed as a free agent bonus baby by the Tigers in 1955 after he graduated from Bellarmine College Preparatory in San Jose, California.

In the majors, Small appeared in 45 games as an outfielder, with the remainder of his MLB games played coming as a pinch hitter or runner. While he was playing in the minor leagues in 1960, the parent Athletics decided to convert Small into a pitcher. After getting shelled in 12 appearances, he was sent back to the outfield. Small did however make one pitching appearance in 1962, his last year in professional baseball.

Small batted .270 in 141 career at bats in the majors; his 38 hits included six doubles and two triples. He was credited with ten runs batted in.

References

External links

1937 births
Living people
Albuquerque Dukes players
Baseball players from Portland, Oregon
Birmingham Barons players
Buffalo Bisons (minor league) players
Charleston Senators players
Detroit Tigers players
Hawaii Islanders players
Kansas City Athletics players
Lewiston Broncs players
Major League Baseball outfielders
Sacramento Solons players
Shreveport Sports players
Bellarmine College Preparatory alumni